Hemphillia skadei, Skade's jumping slug, is a species of air-breathing land slugs, terrestrial pulmonate gastropod mollusks in the family Arionidae, the roundback slugs.
The species name is derived from the Norse goddess Skaði, who is associated with winter and mountains, reflecting the cold and mountainous habitat of the new species.

References

Arionidae